Bien-Aimé was a 74-gun ship of the French Navy.

Construction 
Bien-Aimé was built for the French East India Company, but the French Navy purchased her while under construction.

Career
In 1777, Bien-Aimé was under Captain de Bougainville. The next year, at the outbreak of the War of American Independence, she was part of the squadron under Admiral Lamotte-Picquet, and took part in the action of 2 May 1781.

On 24 April 1781,Bien-Aimé departed Brest, under François Pierre Huon de Kermadec, in the squadron of Admiral Lamotte-Picquet, along with the 110-gun Invincible, the 74-gun Actif, and the 64-gun ships Alexandre, Hardi and Lion, and the frigates Sibylle and Néréide and cutters Chasseur and Levrette.

Fate 
Bien-Aimé was struck from the Navy lists in 1784, and broken up the year after.

Bibliography

References

Ships of the line of the French Navy
1769 ships
Ships built in France